Ricardo de Aparici (23 June 1940 – 19 December 2019) was an Argentinian politician and governor of the province of Jujuy between 1987 and 1990.

References

External links 

1940 births
2019 deaths
Governors of Jujuy Province